Lukas Graber (born 3 May 2001) is a Liechtenstein footballer who plays as a defender for Eschen/Mauren and the Liechtenstein national team.

Career
Graber made his international debut for Liechtenstein on 3 June 2022 in a friendly match against Moldova.

Career statistics

International

Personal life
He is the twin brother of Liechtenstein international player Noah Graber.

References

External links
 
 

2001 births
Living people
People from Vaduz
Liechtenstein footballers
Liechtenstein youth international footballers
Liechtenstein under-21 international footballers
Liechtenstein international footballers
Liechtenstein expatriate footballers
Liechtenstein expatriate sportspeople in Switzerland
Expatriate footballers in Switzerland
Association football wingers
FC Vaduz players
USV Eschen/Mauren players